General elections were held in Uruguay on 26 November 1954. The National Council of Government, the Chamber of Deputies and the Senate were all elected by a single vote cast by each voter. The result was a victory for the Colorado Party.

Results

References

Elections in Uruguay
Uruguay
General
Uruguay
Election and referendum articles with incomplete results